The Romance of Astrea and Celadon is a 2007 historical romantic comedy-drama film written and directed by Éric Rohmer and starring Andy Gillet and Stéphanie Crayencour. Based on Honoré d'Urfé's 17th-century novel L'Astrée, it is the final feature film directed by Rohmer. It was released in France on 5 September 2007.

Plot
In 5th-century Gaul, shepherd Céladon falls in love with Astrée. Falsely believing that Céladon has been unfaithful to her, Astrée banishes him from her sight. Céladon throws himself into the river, but he is saved by a nymph. Céladon tries to meet Astrée again.

Cast

Reception
On Rotten Tomatoes, the film holds an approval rating of 67% based on 42 reviews, with an average rating of 6.11/10. The website's critics consensus reads, "A disappointing melodrama with a pedestrian script and direction."

Peter Bradshaw of The Guardian gave the film 4 out of 5 stars, writing, "it is a quietly delightful film, that calmly puts its faith in poetry and idealism; it is performed with serene confidence and poise, and succeeds in being gently affecting, mysterious and often erotic."

References

External links
 
 

2007 films
2007 romantic comedy-drama films
2000s French-language films
2000s historical comedy-drama films
2000s historical romance films
Cross-dressing in French films
Films based on French novels
Films directed by Éric Rohmer
Films set in the 5th century
Films set in Gaul
Films shot in Auvergne-Rhône-Alpes
French historical comedy-drama films
French historical romance films
French romantic comedy-drama films
Italian historical comedy-drama films
Italian historical romance films
Italian romantic comedy-drama films
Spanish historical comedy-drama films
Spanish historical romance films
Spanish romantic comedy-drama films
2000s French films